Charlotte Worthington  (born 26 June 1996) is a British cyclist and Olympic gold medallist who competes internationally in Freestyle BMX.

Biography
Worthington was born in 1996. Worthington took up BMX seriously at the age of 20, and worked full-time as a chef at a Mexican restaurant near Chorlton for three years before Freestyle BMX was added to the Olympics in 2017. Worthington was accepted on to the Great Britain Cycling Team programme in Freestyle Park and 2019 saw her win the inaugural British and European titles, before she became the first ever British woman to win a world medal in the discipline, taking bronze at the UCI Urban Cycling World Championships in Chengdu behind Hannah Roberts of the US and the Chilean rider Macarena Perez Grasset. She now lives and trains full-time in Corby, Northamptonshire, which is home to 'Adrenaline Alley’ skate park. She also trains at the Asylum skate park near Nottingham. In June 2021 she won bronze in Women's BMX Park at the 2021 UCI Urban Cycling World Championships in Montpellier, again behind Hannah Roberts with Nikita Ducarroz in silver.

Worthington was chosen to be part of the UK's 26 strong cycling squad for the postponed 2020 Tokyo Olympics where she won gold at the Cycling BMX Freestyle park final. On her second run she became the first woman in history to land a 360-degree backflip in competition.

She appeared in the Yogscast Jingle Jam 2021 in partnership with Access Sport.

Worthington was appointed Member of the Order of the British Empire (MBE) in the 2022 New Year Honours for services to BMX racing.

References

External links 
 
 Charlotte Worthington at British Cycling
 

1996 births
Living people
English female cyclists
BMX riders
Sportspeople from Manchester
Olympic gold medallists for Great Britain
Olympic medalists in cycling
Olympic cyclists of Great Britain
Cyclists at the 2020 Summer Olympics
Medalists at the 2020 Summer Olympics
Members of the Order of the British Empire